Kangulovo (Qanğol) is a rural locality (a village) in Amzibashevsky Selsoviet, Kaltasinsky District, Bashkortostan, Russia. The population was 14 as of 2010. There are 6 streets.

Geography 
Kangulovo is located 28 km northwest of Kaltasy (the district's administrative centre) by road. Krasny Yar is the nearest rural locality.

References 

Rural localities in Kaltasinsky District